Christoper Gentile (born 9 September 1981) is a Scottish former footballer.  He first signed 'senior' with Dundee United from their Youth set up but was unable to break through into the 'first' team. He then transferred to Dumbarton where he played for two seasons, but having failed to hold down a regular place in the team, he joined the 'junior' ranks, with Kilsyth Rangers. Four seasons later he rejoined Dumbarton, and in 2008 returned to the 'junior' ranks with Kirkintilloch Rob Roy.

References

1981 births
Scottish footballers
Dumbarton F.C. players
Scottish Football League players
Living people
Association football midfielders